The 3rd Vietnam Film Festival was held from March 15 to March 25, 1975 in Haiphong, Vietnam, with the slogan: "For the Fatherland and Socialism. For the development of national cinema." (Vietnamese: "Vì Tổ quốc và Chủ nghĩa xã hội. Vì sự phát triển của nền điện ảnh dân tộc").

Event 
This is the first film festival where films are shown to a large audience, also artists can meet and interact with the public. The total number of films registered for the competition is 111, including 4 feature films: "Em bé Hà Nội", "Quê nhà", "Đến hẹn lại lên", "Bài ca ra trận". In addition, there are 27 documentaries, 13 animated films, 43 news-themed films, 8 science films and 9 science-themed films.

In the end, 4 Golden Lotuses were awarded for the following categories: Feature Film (2 films), Documentary Film (1 film), Animated Film (1 film). Compared to the previous two film festivals, the number of awards in this period is much less, possibly because the organization and grading of awards has become more methodical.

Awards

Feature film

Documentary/Science film

Animated film

References 

Vietnam Film Festival
Vietnam Film Festival
1975 in Vietnam